Strange Inheritance is an American television docu-series which airs on Fox Business Network. The series examines unusual inheritances and the stories behind them. The series is produced by Towers Productions and hosted by Jamie Colby and premiered on 26 January 2015.

The back-to-back premiere of the first two episodes of the series was the highest rating launch in the channel's history at the time, with 289,000 and 315,000 viewers respectively.

Broadcast
The first season debuted on January 26, 2015. The series was renewed for a second season which began on November 11, 2015. A third season premiered on January 20, 2017. A fourth season aired on January 15, 2018.

Episodes

References

External links

2010s American television news shows
2015 American television series debuts
Fox Business original programming
English-language television shows
Business-related television series